Kota Sultan Ahmad Shah, known as KotaSAS, is a planned township located about 10 kilometers northwest of Kuantan, Pahang, Malaysia. It will serve as the new administrative centre for the state once fully completed. 

The development of KotaSAS as a new township started in 2006, with Tanah Makmur Berhad commissioned as the main developer. KotaSAS is located near the ECRL, making this township a transportation and commercial hub.

References

External links

Populated places in Pahang